Wakefield Township may refer to the following places in the United States:

 Wakefield Township, Gogebic County, Michigan
 Wakefield Township, Stearns County, Minnesota
 Wakefield Township, Dixon County, Nebraska

See also

Wakefield (disambiguation)

Township name disambiguation pages